David Panter [also written Painter, or Paniter] (died 1 October 1558), Scottish diplomat, clerk and bishop of Ross, was the illegitimate son of Patrick Paniter, secretary to James IV; his mother was Margaret Crichton, illegitimate daughter of William Crichton, 3rd Lord Crichton and widow countess of Rothes.

He and his sister were legitimised on 13 August 1513. He was a university graduate, probably at the University of St. Andrews.

On 8 April 1536, he received crown nomination to the papacy for provision to become commendator St Mary's Isle in Galloway; in 1549 he became successor to Alexander Mylne as commendator of the abbey of Cambuskenneth, for which he had been coadjutor (designated successor) since 7 August 1534. On 23 December 1545, he obtained a crown provision to the abbey of Fearn, though that was unsuccessful.

Employed by Mary of Guise, he was in France in February 1542 on some unknown errand, and on 31 March 1544, was sent thither with Sir John Campbell of Lundie on a mission to the French king. He returned in June with John Hamilton, abbot of Paisley, in time to assist Cardinal Beaton's opposition to the English matrimonial schemes of the English court.  In 1543 he became secretary to James V.

The letters of the English ambassadors, preserved in Sadler's Papers, and George Buchanan's bitter criticism testify to the strength of his influence on behalf of France. In December he was ordered by the governor to deliver back, according to custom, the badge of knighthood of the Golden Fleece to the Emperor Charles V.

In 1545 he became bishop of Ross, and in May of that year was sent on a mission to the king of France, the Emperor, and Mary of Hungary. He was abroad for seven years. On his return, in 1552, he received consecration to his bishopric at Jedburgh, before a brilliant assembly of the Scottish nobles. He died, according to Holinshed, at Stirling on 1 October 1558, and was succeeded in the bishopric by Henry Sinclair. On 1 October 1558, Mary of Guise sent the Dingwall Pursuivant to Cambuskenneth to seize his belongings. His goods were forfeit to the crown on account of his illegitimacy.

References 

 Dowden, John, The Bishops of Scotland, ed. J. Maitland Thomson, (Glasgow, 1912)
 Gould, J. A., "Panter, David (d. 1558)", Oxford Dictionary of National Biography, Oxford University Press, 2004 , retrieved 6 Oct 2007
 Smith, G. G., 
 Watt, D. E. R., Fasti Ecclesiae Scotinanae Medii Aevi ad annum 1638, 2nd Draft, (St Andrews, 1969)
 Watt, D. E. R. & Shead, N. F. (eds.), The Heads of Religious Houses in Scotland from the 12th to the 16th Centuries, The Scottish Records Society, New Series, Volume 24, (Edinburgh, 2001)

Notes

Attribution

1558 deaths
Alumni of the University of St Andrews
Bishops of Ross (Scotland)
Scottish abbots
Scottish diplomats
Scottish priors
16th-century Scottish Roman Catholic bishops
Members of the Privy Council of Scotland
16th-century Scottish people
Year of birth unknown
16th-century diplomats